Chokee is an unincorporated community in Lee County, in the U.S. state of Georgia.

History
A post office called Chokee was established in 1882, and remained in operation until 1905. The community's name is derived from the Muscogee language. In 1900, Chokee had about 120 inhabitants.

References

Unincorporated communities in Lee County, Georgia